The Cleveland Squash Classic 2016 is the women's edition of the 2016 Cleveland Classic, which is a tournament of the PSA World Tour event International (Prize money : 50 000 $). The event took place at the Cleveland Racket Club in Cleveland, Ohio in United States from 30 January to 2 February. Camille Serme won her first Cleveland Classic trophy, beating Alison Waters in the final.

Prize money and ranking points
For 2016, the prize purse was $50,000. The prize money and points breakdown is as follows:

Seeds

Draw and results

See also
Cleveland Classic
2016 PSA World Tour

References

External links
PSA Cleveland Classic 2016 website
Cleveland Classic 2016 Squashsite website

Women's Cleveland Classic
Women's Cleveland Classic
2016 in American sports
Cleveland Classic